Júlio César Simonato Cordeiro (born 25 June 1976), commonly known as Alemão, is a Brazilian born, Spanish futsal player who plays for Dina Moscow as an Ala.

Biography
Alemão began his career in the Brazilian clubs until he moved to Spanish club "CML Talavera." There he played for two seasons and helped the club to win the Spanish championship. Alemão three years after that he was playing in the Brazilian championship, until he signed a contract with a new Spanish champion "Playas de Castellón." During two years of being a part of that team he did not win any trophies in the domestic arena, but he achieved great success in European cups, winning two debut futsal UEFA Cups. Alemão scored goals in the finals of both games, and in the final of the 2002/03 season he was able to make a double.

In 2003, he moved to "Lobelle" and spent nine years there, helped the club to win the Cup and the Super Cup of Spain. Later he got the Spanish citizenship and his game was so impressive for the Spanish national team coach, that at the age of 34  he debuted in the national team. Later, he became a member of the UEFA Futsal Championship in 2012, where the Spaniards triumphantly won the gold. Alemão became the best player of the tournament in terms of goal and passes.

At the European championship Alemão was already a player of Dina Moscow. In February he debuted in the Russian championship.

Achievements
European Futsal Champion (1): 2012
UEFA Futsal Cup (2): 2002, 2003
Spanish Futsal League Champion (1): 1995/96
Spanish Futsal Cup Winner (1): 2006
Spanish Futsal Super Cup winner (1): 2010
Russian Futsal Championship (1): 2014

References

External links
MFK Dina Moskva profile
AMFR profile
Futsalplanet profile
RFEF profile
UEFA profile

1976 births
Living people
Brazilian emigrants to Spain
Spanish men's futsal players
Brazilian men's futsal players
Playas de Castellón FS players
Santiago Futsal players
MFK Dina Moskva players
Sportspeople from São Paulo